The Gruener Strom Label association (the “Grüner Strom Label e.V." or "GSL e.V.“) certifies green energy sources or production. The Bonn based association was founded at the initiative of EUROSOLAR in December 1998. The GSL e.V. issues two seals of approval – one, named Grüner Strom, introduced in 1999, is granted for green electricity, and the other, named Grünes Gas, introduced in 2013, is granted for biogas. By 1999, Grüner Strom was the first certification for electricity from green power sources in Germany.Grüner Strom and Grünes Gas are the only seals of approval in Germany, indicating endorsement by leading environmental organizations. The goal of products recommended by certification is to increase transparency in the green electricity and biogas markets and to advance ecologically sustainable energy supply.

Supporters 
The Grüner Strom Label e. V. indicates support and endorsement by the following organizations:
 EUROSOLAR(The European Association for Renewable Energy)
 Bund für Umwelt und Naturschutz Deutschland (BUND) (German League for Environment and Nature Protection)
 Naturschutzbund Deutschland (NABU) (German Nature Protection League)
 Deutscher Naturschutzring (DNR) (German League for Nature, Animal and Environment Protection)
 International Physicians for the Prevention of Nuclear War (IPPNW German Affiliate)
 Die Verbraucher Initiative (The Consumers Initiative Association for consumer information, focusing onenvironmental, health and social protection of consumers)
 NaturwissenschaftlerInnen-Initiative (Scientists Initiative for Peace)

Grüner Strom: The Seal of Approval for Green Electricity 

Meeting the following essential requirements of the Criteria List is a prerequisite for certification:
 Electricity must be sourced 100 % from renewable energy (from already existing or new power plants).
 Electricity providers must use a fixed amount per sold kilowatt-hour to promote new renewable energy development. In the case of customers with a consumption of:
 Up to 10.000 kWh/year, 0.5 Euro-Cent per kWh
 Between 10,000 kWh and 100,000 kWh/year, 0.4 Euro-Cent per kWh
 Between 100,000 kWh and 3,000,000 kWh/year, 0.2 Euro-Cent per kWh
 More than 3.000.000 kWh/year, 0.1 Euro-Cent per kWh
The Grüner Strom certification is not granted to companies directly involved in nuclear power plants or to operators of nuclear companies or to companies with ownership interests/capital stock in nuclear operating companies.
 The Grüner Strom certification is not granted to companies with new and direct ownership interests in existing or newly built coal-fired power plants, purchased after the Criteria List 2015 has taken effect.
 Renewable Energy Certificates/Credits are not accepted to prove fulfillment of the delivery obligation.
The funding amounts are mostly used to make financial contributions or to co-finance new green power generating plants that are eligible for support pursuant to the Renewable Energy Sources Act (EEG) at the same time. But they are used for power plants generating electricity for direct sale and distribution as well. Also the funds can partly go to installations abroad and to energy efficiency measures and projects, including citizen energy projects, which are spurring the transformation of the energy system and the associated infrastructure. Electricity providers must report about the projects supported by certification on the Internet. In addition, successfully completed projects are listed on the GSL e.V. website. Over 70 power supply companies offer green electricity certified to the Grüner Strom criteria. The Grüner Strom certification is granted for products. The GSL e.V., thereby, recommends individual electricity product options by certification.

Data 
Figure 1: Amount of Grüner Strom Certified Green Electricity Sold Since 1999:

Source: The Grüner Strom Label e. V., 05/2021

Electricity providers have invested over 80 million euros from their products recommended by the Grüner Strom certification since inception of the program through 2018 (see figure 2).

Figure 2: Overview of Investments Since 1999

Note: The invested amounts vary because the funds can be invested during a two-years time period. Source: The Grüner Strom Label e. V., 05/2021.

Up to now, thanks to the Grüner Strom certification model, over 1,600 new electricity-generating plants have been initiated. They cover all sources of renewable energy. In 2013 for example, about 3.4 million euros have been made available, some 80 % of which for renewable electricity generating plants (see table 1).

Table 1: Funded Projects In 2013*

* Because some Grüner Strom label users still are in the certification process the values shown are preliminary 2013 data. In all likelihood, the final data will be higher.

** Most of the projects listed in the category “development cooperation“ are RE plants all the same. They are allocated to this category because they were installed in developing and transitional countries.

Grünes Gas: The Seal of Approval for Biogas 

The Grünes Gas certification was launched in June 2013. The seal is awarded for gas products when the production, use and distribution of the biogas meet the requirements as set out in the Criteria List. These include for example:
 Biogas must be sourced by environmentally friendly means (it is not permitted to turn precious habitats into monoculture for example).
 A strong focus on crop sequencing balance.
 It is not permitted to use problematic herbicides and fertilizers from factory farming.
 It is not permitted to use genetically engineered organisms in the production process.
 Certification requires biogas (biomethane) or sewage gas. Landfill gas is not accepted.
 Primarily, regional raw materials should be used (raw materials carried over distances beyond 50 km are judged negatively).
 Gas providers are transparent about the composition of their product (a minimum of 10 % certified biogas).
Conformity of suppliers and providers, producers and power supply companies is verified based on rating system credit points. Currently, Grünes Gas is the only seal of approval for biogas indicating endorsement by environmental organizations, including consumer information groups.

Data 
Three biogas products have achieved the Grünes Gas certification since January 1,2014. Preliminary estimates suggest that some 12,500 consumers bought biogas, which was certified to the Grünes Gas standards. Gas sales were estimated at 120,200 MWh. Based on the annual average of total sales 14 % of the gas sales was biogas, i.e. the equivalent of some 16,830 MWh.

References

External links 
 The Grüner Strom Label e.V. Association: Official Website
 BEUC - The European Consumer Organisation (2016-01): New report shows consumers struggle to get what they want with renewable energy
 Verbraucherzentrale Niedersachsen e.V. (2016-01-16): Überblick: Die wichtigsten Ökostrom-Labels (Available in German)
 (ZDF) Zweites Deutsche Fernsehen [public-service broadcasting] (2015-06-01): Umweltfreundlicher Strom (Available in German)
 Deutschlandradio [public-service broadcasting] (2015-02-03): Verschärfte Kriterien für das Ökolabel "Grüner Strom" (Available in German)
 Energieinitiative.org (2014-11-25): Interview with Daniel Craffonara of the Grüner Strom Label e.V. (Available in German)
 ÖKO-TEST Verlag GmbH (2014-11): Test Öko-Stromtarife. In: Öko-Test-Magazin 11/2014 (Available in German)

Environmental organisations based in Germany
Sustainability organizations
Renewable energy organizations
Renewable energy certification
Organizations established in 1998
1998 establishments in Germany